Jason Abraham Roberts is the professional name of American musician and producer Jason Roberts. Roberts is best known for his collaborations with Bedouine, Norah Jones, Hymns, Ben Kweller, and The Candles.

Musical career

2004–2007: Ben Kweller 

Roberts met Ben Kweller at The Living Room shortly after relocating to New York City.

Kweller was about to embark on the On My Way world-tour and on the hunt for a new guitarist; Roberts quickly filled this role to play guitar and piano at 92 concerts. Roberts toured again with Kweller in 2006 in support of the album: Ben Kweller.

2006–2010: Hymns 

In fall 2006, Roberts formed the band: Hymns with Brian Harding, Matt Shaw, and Tony Kent.

The band would later release the record Brother/Sister, which was critically acclaimed by Spin Magazine and MTV News. Afterwards, the band toured with Ben Kweller, The Lemonheads, Butch Walker, and Daniel Johnston. Later, Roberts and the Hymns released the albums: Travel in Herds (2008) and Appaloosa (2009).

Roberts and other members of Hymns were also Daniel Johnston's backing band for several tours, including an appearance at the Hollywood Bowl (2014).

2010–2017: The Candles 

Roberts was a member of The Candles.

The band had toured several times with The Lemonheads, acted as Evan Dando's backing band, and opened for Norah Jones on her Daybreaks World Tour.

2012–2017: Norah Jones 

Roberts was the lead guitarist in the Norah Jones band.

He toured extensively with her during the 2012-2013: Little Broken Hearts Tour and the 2016-2017: Daybreaks World Tour. Roberts has appeared live with Jones on television and radio programs including Late Night with Jimmy Fallon, Later... with Jools Holland, Austin City Limits, and the Late Show with David Letterman.

2017-Present: Bedouine 

Roberts is the lead guitarist in Bedouine's band.

Other Notable Appearances

Musical Performances 
Aug. 2012: Roberts performed with Bob Weir at the Outside Lands Music and Arts Festival.
Aug. 2012: Roberts performed with Phil Lesh (Grateful Dead), Bob Weir (Grateful Dead), and Mike Gordon (Phish) at Jerry Garcia's 70th birthday party. 
 The Move Me Brightly event was held at TRI Studios.
Jan. 2013: Roberts performed with Jon Fishman (Phish) at the 'Long May You Run' Benefit Concert in Washington DC.
Oct. 2016: Roberts performed with Neil Young at The Bridge School Benefit in Mountain View, CA
Between Feb. and April 2018: Roberts toured with Jonathan Wilson in the US and Europe.

Selected Discography

References 

Living people
American rock guitarists
American male guitarists
Year of birth missing (living people)